HMS Ravager (D70) was an  built in the United States (as part of the ) and operated by the Royal Navy during World War II.

Ravager was initially constructed in the U.S. by Seattle-Tacoma Shipbuilding in Tacoma, in 1942. She was purchased by the U.S. Navy and was converted to an escort carrier at Commercial Iron Works, Portland, Oregon. Upon completion in 1943 she was transferred to the Royal Navy and named HMS Ravager.

The ship initially served as a convoy escort in the Atlantic theatre. Later in the war she was used mainly as a deck-landing training carrier. In February 1946 she was returned to the US Navy and sold for civilian use in July 1947, being renamed Robin Trent and later Trent. She was scrapped in 1973.

Construction
Ravager (AVG-24) was laid down as MC hull 240 on 11 April 1942, by Seattle-Tacoma Shipbuilding Corp., Tacoma, Washington. She was intended to be named Charger, but was named Ravager when launched 16 July 1942; sponsored by Mrs. C. G. Mitchell; acquired by the U.S. Navy and transferred to the United Kingdom under lend-lease on 25 April 1943; and commissioned in the Royal Navy the same day.

Design and description
These ships were all larger and had a greater aircraft capacity than all the preceding American built escort carriers. They were also all laid down as escort carriers and not converted merchant ships.

Aircraft facilities were a small combined bridge–flight control on the starboard side, two aircraft lifts , one aircraft catapult and nine arrestor wires. Armament comprised: two /50, /38 or 5 in/51 Dual Purpose guns in single mounts, sixteen Bofors 40 mm Automatic Gun L/60 anti-aircraft guns in twin mounts and twenty 20 mm anti-aircraft cannons in single mounts. They had a maximum aircraft capacity of twenty-four aircraft which could be a mixture of Grumman Martlet, Vought F4U Corsair or Hawker Sea Hurricane fighter aircraft and Fairey Swordfish or Grumman Avenger anti-submarine aircraft.

Service history

During World War II, Ravager, redesignated on U.S. Navy records as CVE-24 on 15 July 1943, operated in the Atlantic protecting Allied shipping from German U-boats. After the war ended, she arrived Norfolk, 9 February 1946, and was returned to the U.S. Navy there on 27 February, the day she was decommissioned by the Royal Navy. Ravager was sold to William B. St. John, of New York City, 1 July 1947, and was placed in merchant service as Robin Trent.

References

Sources

External links 

 
 

 

Type C3-S-A1 ships of the Royal Navy
Attacker-class escort carriers
Ships built in Tacoma, Washington
1942 ships
World War II aircraft carriers of the United Kingdom